Lists of government ministers of Finland

The Minister of Economic Affairs is one of the Finnish Government's ministerial positions. Along with the Minister of Employment the Minister of Economic Affairs is located within the Ministry of Economic Affairs and Employment.

The Marin Cabinet's incumbent Minister of Economic Affairs is Mika Lintilä of the Centre Party.

Ministers

References

External links